This is a list of the first women lawyer(s) and judge(s) in Pennsylvania. It includes the year in which the women were admitted to practice law (in parentheses). Also included are women who achieved other distinctions such becoming the first in their state to graduate from law school or become a political figure.

Firsts in Pennsylvania's history

Law School 

 First African American female law graduate: Sadie Tanner Mossell Alexander (1927)

Lawyers 

First female: Caroline Burnham Kilgore (1883) 
First African American female: Sadie Tanner Mossell Alexander (1927) 
First Latino American female (Puerto Rican descent): Mari Carmen Aponte 
First blind female: Natalie Ruschell (1988)

Law clerk 

 First female to clerk for the Supreme Court of Pennsylvania: Norma Levy Shapiro (1951)

State judges 

First female judge: Sara M. Soffel in 1930
 First female magistrate (non-attorney): Hannah Elizabeth Byrd in 1951 
First African American female: Juanita Kidd Stout in 1959 
First female (Pennsylvania Supreme Court): Anne X. Alpern (1927) in 1961  
First female (commonwealth court): Genevieve Blatt in 1972
First African American female (Pennsylvania Supreme Court): Juanita Kidd Stout in 1988 
First African American female (commonwealth court): Doris Smith-Ribner (1972) in 1988 
First Latino American female: Nitza Quiñones Alejandro in 1991 
First female elected (Pennsylvania Supreme Court): Sandra Schultz Newman (1972) in 1995 
First openly lesbian: Ann Butchart in 2005 
First Latino American female (district court): Nancy Matos Gonzalez in 2015 
First Muslim American (female): Nusrat Rashid in 2019
First female (Chief Justice, Pennsylvania Supreme Court): Debra Todd in 2022

Federal judges 
First female (U.S. District Court for the Eastern District of Pennsylvania): Norma Levy Shapiro (1951) in 1978 
First female (Senior United States district judge of the United States District Court for the Middle District of Pennsylvania): Sylvia H. Rambo in 2001 
First South Asian American female (U.S. District Court for the Western District of Pennsylvania): Cathy Bissoon (1993) in 2011
First openly lesbian and Latino American female (U.S. District Court for the Eastern District of Pennsylvania): Nitza Quiñones Alejandro (1975) in 2013
First African American female (Chief Judge; U.S. District Court for the Eastern District of Pennsylvania): Petrese B. Tucker (1976) in 2013

Attorney General of Pennsylvania 

First female appointed: Anne X. Alpern (1927) in 1959 
First female elected: Kathleen Kane (1993) from 2013-2016

Deputy Attorney General 

 First female: Dr. M. Louise Rutherford in 1939
First female (First Deputy): Michelle Henry in 2016

Assistant Attorney General 

 First female: M. Vashti Burr from 1926-1931

United States Attorney 

 First female (Eastern District of Pennsylvania): Laurie Magid from 2008-2009  
 First Asian American (female) (Western District of Pennsylvania): Cindy K. Chung in 2021 
 First female (of color/openly LGBT) (Eastern District of Pennsylvania): Jacqueline C. Romero in 2022

Assistant United States Attorney 

 First female (Middle District of Pennsylvania): Barbara Kosik Whitaker in 1979

District Attorney 

 First African American female to lead a District Attorney's office in Pennsylvania: Kelley B. Hodge

Political Office 

 First African American female (U.S. House of Representatives from Pennsylvania): Summer Lee in 2022

Pennsylvania Bar Association 

 First female president: Leslie Anne Miller around 1999 
 First Latino American female president: Sharon López in 2017

Firsts in local history

 Sara M. Soffel: First female judge in Allegheny County, Pennsylvania (1930)
 Doris Smith-Ribner (1972): First African American female appointed as a Judge of the Allegheny County Common Pleas Court (1987)
 Cynthia Baldwin: First African American female judge in Allegheny County, Pennsylvania (1989)
 Donna Jo McDaniel: First female elected as the president judge in Allegheny County, Pennsylvania (2008)
 Katie Charlton: First female District Attorney of Armstrong County, Pennsylvania (2017)
 Debbie Kunselman: First female judge in Beaver County, Pennsylvania (2005)
 Jolene Grubb Kopriva (1978): First female judge in Blair County, Pennsylvania (1987)
 Harriet Mims: First female judge in Bucks County, Pennsylvania
 Diane Gibbons: First female District Attorney for Bucks County, Pennsylvania (2000)
 Jean Horan: First female judge in Butler County, Pennsylvania
 Helena A. Ivory (1922): First female lawyer in Cambria County, Pennsylvania
 Linda Fleming (1988): First female judge in Cambria County, Pennsylvania
 Jean A. Engler: First female District Attorney for Carbon County, Pennsylvania (2014)
 Pamela A. Ruest: First female elected judge and to serve as a president judge in Centre County, Pennsylvania (2007)
 Stacy Parks Miller: First female District Attorney for Centre County, Pennsylvania (2009)
 Isabel Darlington: First female lawyer in Chester County, Pennsylvania
 Paula Francisco Ott: First female judge in Chester County, Pennsylvania (1991)
 Deborah “Deb” Ryan: First female District Attorney for Chester County, Pennsylvania (2020)
 Shirley Ann Bellmer (1957): First female lawyer in Clarion County, Pennsylvania
 Sara Seidle-Patton: First female to serve as a Judge of the Common Pleas in Clarion County, Pennsylvania (2019)
 Gloria Haggerty: First female lawyer in Clinton County, Pennsylvania
 Kathleen Long: First female Public Defender for Clinton County, Pennsylvania (2014)
 Angela Harding: First female to serve as a Commissioner for Clinton County, Pennsylvania (2020)
 Gloria Pepicelli: First female lawyer in Crawford County, Pennsylvania
 Paula DiGiacomo: First female to serve as the District Attorney for Crawford County, Pennsylvania (2022)
 Sylvia H. Rambo: First female judge appointed to the Pennsylvania Court of Common Pleas for Cumberland County, Pennsylvania (1976)
 Syndi Guido Conrad (1987): First female Assistant District Attorney for Cumberland County, Pennsylvania (1987)
 Danielle Conway: First female (and African American) to serve as the Dean of Penn State Dickinson Law (2019)
 Patricia Holstein: First female District Attorney for Delaware County, Pennsylvania (2001-2002)
 Nusrat Rashid: First African American female to serve as a judge in Delaware County, Pennsylvania (2019)
 Zanita A. Zacks-Gabriel (1975): First female lawyer in Erie, Pennsylvania [Erie County, Pennsylvania]
 Elizabeth Hirz: First female to serve as the District Attorney for Erie County, Pennsylvania (2022)
 Ione Romeika (1948): First female lawyer in Fayette County, Pennsylvania
 Nancy Vernon (1980): First female judge and district attorney in Fayette County, Pennsylvania. She was also the first woman to practice criminal law in the county.
 Carol Van Horn: First female judge in Franklin County, Pennsylvania (1999)
 Stella McAnulty Hadden: First female Justice of the Peace in Indiana County, Pennsylvania
 Caroline Hoffer: First female President of the Lancaster Bar Association (1993) [Lancaster County, Pennsylvania]
 Heather Adams: First female to serve as the District Attorney for Lancaster County, Pennsylvania (2020)
 Holly F. Moehlmann (1971): First female lawyer in Lebanon County, Pennsylvania
 Amy Zanelli: First openly LGBT female elected as a judge in Lehigh County, Pennsylvania (upon her service on the Lehigh County Lehigh County Court of Common Pleas in 2021)
 Mary Luella Trescott: First female lawyer in Luzerne County, Pennsylvania
 Mary Slesinski: First female Justice of the Peace in Laflin, Pennsylvania [Luzerne County, Pennsylvania]
 Louise Larzelere Chatham (1923): First female lawyer in Lycoming County, Pennsylvania
 Margherita Patti-Worthington: First female to become President Judge of the Forty-Third Judicial District, Monroe County, Pennsylvania
 Risa Vetri Ferman: First female to serve as the District Attorney for Montgomery County, Pennsylvania (2006)
 Rebecca Warren: First female elected as the District Attorney for Montour County, Pennsylvania
 Joan Marinkovits: First female judge in Northampton Burough, Pennsylvania [Northampton County, Pennsylvania]
 Tamara L. Greenfield King: First African American (female) to serve as the Assistant District Attorney of Northampton County, Pennsylvania (1992)
 Ann Targonski: First female District Attorney for Northumberland County, Pennsylvania (2014)
 Tillie Thompson Heilbron: First female to serve as the Assistant District Attorney for Philadelphia (c. 1930)
 Hazel H. Brown: First female judge in Philadelphia, Pennsylvania [Philadelphia County, Pennsylvania]
 Linda Sheryl Greene: First African American female to teach at Temple University Beasley School of Law (1978)
 Carolyn Engel Temin: First female Public Defender in Philadelphia, Pennsylvania (c. 1987). She later became a judge. [Philadelphia County, Pennsylvania]
 Ann Butchart: First openly LGBT female judge in Philadelphia and first LGBT candidate in Philadelphia (2005) [Philadelphia County, Pennsylvania]
 Lisa Lazzari-Strasiser: First female District Attorney for Somerset County, Pennsylvania (2011)
 Katherine Pontius Baker: First female lawyer in Union County, Pennsylvania
 Janine Edwards (1997): First female judge in Wayne County, Pennsylvania. She was also the first female District Attorney in the county's history.
 Jocelyn Cramer: First female to serve as a Commissioner for Wayne County, Pennsylvania (2020)
 Sara A. Austin: First female lawyer from York County to serve as the President of the Pennsylvania Bar Association (2016)

See also  

 List of first women lawyers and judges in the United States
 Timeline of women lawyers in the United States
 Women in law

Other topics of interest 

 List of first minority male lawyers and judges in the United States
 List of first minority male lawyers and judges in Pennsylvania

References 

Lawyers, Pennsylvania, first
Pennsylvania, first
Women, Pennsylvania, first
Women, Pennsylvania, first
Women in Pennsylvania
Lists of people from Pennsylvania
Pennsylvania lawyers